Callum Rhys Ryan-Phillips is a Welsh footballer who plays as a defender for Merthyr Town.

Career
He made his senior debut for Newport County on 6 October 2020 in the starting lineup for the 5-0 EFL Trophy defeat to Norwich City Under 21's. Ryan-Phillips made his second appearance for Newport on 10 November 2020 in the starting lineup for the 3–1 EFL Trophy defeat to Plymouth Argyle. He was released by Newport at the end of the 2021-22 season. 

On 28 July 2022, Ryan-Phillips joined Southern League Premier Division South club Merthyr Town following a successful trial period.

References

External links

2004 births
Living people
Sportspeople from Monmouth, Wales
Welsh footballers
Association football midfielders
Newport County A.F.C. players
Merthyr Town F.C. players